Baron Swansea, of Singleton in the County of Glamorgan, is a title in the Peerage of the United Kingdom and held by a branch of the Vivian family. It was created on 9 June 1893 for the industrialist Sir Henry Vivian, 1st Baronet. He had already been created a Baronet, of Singleton in the County of Glamorgan, on 13 May 1882. He was succeeded by his eldest son, the second Baron. On his death the titles passed to his half-brother, the third Baron.  the titles are held by the latter's grandson, the fifth Baron, who succeeded his father in 2005.

John Henry Vivian, father of the first Baron, was an industrialist and politician. The soldier Hussey Vivian, 1st Baron Vivian, was the uncle of the first Baron. The Liberal politician Sir Arthur Vivian was the younger brother of the first Baron.

Barons Swansea (1893)

Henry Hussey Vivian, 1st Baron Swansea (1821–1894)
Ernest Ambrose Vivian, 2nd Baron Swansea (1848–1922)
Odo Richard Vivian, 3rd Baron Swansea (1875–1934)
John Hussey Hamilton Vivian, 4th Baron Swansea (1925–2005)
Richard Anthony Hussey Vivian, 5th Baron Swansea (born 1957)

The heir apparent is the present holder's son, the Hon. James Henry Hussey Vivian (born 1999).

Male-line family tree

See also
Vivian family
Baron Vivian

Notes

References

Baronies in the Peerage of the United Kingdom
Noble titles created in 1893
Noble titles created for UK MPs
Swansea